Jack Coombs Field is a baseball stadium in Durham, North Carolina, USA. It is the on-campus home field of the Duke University Blue Devils college baseball teams. As of the 2011 season, Duke uses Coombs Field for all weekday games and Durham Bulls Athletic Park for weekend games.

The stadium holds 2,000 people.  It was dedicated in 1951 for former Duke baseball coach Jack Coombs. The field itself was first used in 1931.  The stonework on the grandstand exterior suggests the Neo-Gothic architectural design used with most of the West Campus buildings.

The ballpark stands in the western portion of the athletic complex on Duke's West Campus.  It is bounded by Science Drive (northwest, left and center fields); Whitford Drive (southwest - left field, third base, and home plate); Krzyzewski Center (east, first base); and a service road (northeast, center and right fields).

Renovations
In 2001, an indoor hitting facility was added.

Prior to the 2011 season, an AstroTurf surface was installed at the field, allowing for greater flexibility in the program's use of the venue.  In addition, minor changes were made to the field's fences, lights, and dimensions.  The stadium was custom fit with Promats Athletics wall padding, netting system, and foul poles.

Other features include locker rooms, a sprinkler system, and offices.

See also
 List of NCAA Division I baseball venues

References

Sports venues in Durham, North Carolina
Duke Blue Devils baseball venues
1931 establishments in North Carolina
Sports venues completed in 1931